Steinstolen (released 1998 by the label Heilo - HCD 7145) is the second album from Norwegian folk band Bukkene Bruse.

Reception

AllMusic awarded the album 3 stars.

Track listing
«Numedalshalling / Hailing From Numedal» (4:12) (Traditional)
«Min Gut / My Boy» (3:06) (Steinar Ofsdal / Lyrics: Stein Versto)
«Steinstolen / The Stone Chair» (2:19) (Traditional)
«Springar I Dur / Springar In A Major Key» (2:07) (Traditional)
«Folktone Fra Sunnmøre / Folk Tune From Sunnmere» (4:06) (Traditional / Bjørn Ole Rasch)
«Runarvisa / Song Of The Runes» (4:57) (Traditional)
«Ein Annan Halling / Another Hailing» (3:42) (Steinar Ofsdal)
«Maria, Hun Er En Jomfru Reen / Virgin Mary» (3:30) (Traditional)
«Margrete» (2:28) (Arve Moen Bergset)
«Kjellstadhallingen» (3:30) (Ola Kjellstad)
«Løvehjerte / Lionheart» (4:28) (Annbjørg Lien / Bjørn Ole RRasch)
«Stev» (4:13) (Stein Versto)
«Kjetil» (3:03) (Steinar Ofsdal)
«Bruremarsj Fra Østerdalen / Wedding March From Østerdalen» (3:13) (Traditional)
«Norafjølls / The Northern Fjords» (4:56) (Gunnulf Borgen)
«Olav Høljesen» (2:52) (Traditional)
«Bendik Og Årolilja» (6:08) (Traditional)
«Fenta / Gypsy Woman» (3:47) (Traditional)
«Til Sætersdal / To Setesdal» (2:57) (Arve Moen Bergset)
«Nåvårsetermarsjen / March From Nåvårsetra» (3:04) (Arve Moen Bergset)
«Fanitullen / The Devil's Tune» (3:53) (Arve Moen Bergset)

References

External links

Bukkene Bruse albums
1998 albums